The commissure of superior colliculus, also called the commissure of superior colliculi is a thin white matter structure consisting of myelinated axons of neurons and joining together the paired superior colliculi.

It is evolutionarily one of the most ancient interhemispheric connections.

References 

Superior colliculus
Corpora quadrigemina
Tectum
Midbrain